The Ahavas Sholem Synagogue, once known colloquially as The White Street Shul and now as the Thomas Hill Chapel, is a historic religious building at 30 White Street in New Haven, Connecticut.  Built in 1928 for an Orthodox congregation founded in 1912, it is a distinctive example of a neighborhood synagogue with elaborate Classical Revival styling, for which it was listed on the National Register of Historic Places in 1995.   The building is now home to Thomas Chapel, which is affiliated with the Church of Christ.

Description and history
The former Ahavas Sholem Synagogue stands on the west side of White Street, a short residential street in New Haven's The Hill neighborhood, southwest of downtown.  It is a two-story masonry structure, built out of gold-colored brick with limestone trim.  It has a particularly handsome Classical Revival facade, with limestone on the first level, which is continued on the second level around that floor's arched windows.  A panel above the main entrance identifies the congregation and the year of the building's construction in the Hebrew calendar.  Some of its original windows are incised with the Star of David, which is repeated in a rounded pediment at the roof level.

An Orthodox congregation was organized in this neighborhood in 1912.  According to Orthodox practice, it was necessary to walk to Sabbath services, resulting in the founding of relatively small congregations such as this one.  The building was erected in 1928, and was used by the congregation until most of its members moved away in the 1960s.  The building is now occupied by a Christian congregation, the Thomas Hill Chapel Church of Christ.

The building  was listed on the National Register of Historic Places in 1995.

See also
Agudath Sholem Synagogue, Stamford, listed on the NRHP in Fairfield County, Connecticut
Ohev Sholem Synagogue, New London, listed on the NRHP in New London County, Connecticut
National Register of Historic Places listings in New Haven, Connecticut

References

External links
Thomas Chapel website

Synagogues in Connecticut
Buildings and structures in New Haven, Connecticut
National Register of Historic Places in New Haven, Connecticut
Synagogues on the National Register of Historic Places in Connecticut
1928 establishments in Connecticut
Synagogues completed in 1928
Neoclassical architecture in Connecticut
Neoclassical synagogues